A Song for Me is the third album by the British progressive rock band Family, released on 23 January 1970 on Reprise Records.

Background
The album was recorded in late 1969 at Olympic Studios in London.  It was their first album with new members John Weider on bass and Poli Palmer on keyboards, flute and vibraphone.  The past several months had been full of setbacks for Family. Rick Grech left for Blind Faith, Jim King was forced to leave for getting too deep into drug addiction, and their first U.S. tour proved to be a disaster.

Although many of the songs had been written with King's saxophone in mind, Charlie Whitney and Roger Chapman were able to rework them with Palmer's instruments, and Palmer quickly made himself integral to Family's sound. Because some of these songs had been debuted in live performances in the previous year, many Family fans found themselves getting accommodated to arrangements that sounded radically different from what they expected.

Much of A Song for Me shows Family exploring various popular forms, from jazz and blues to folk and country.

Track listing
All tracks written by John "Charlie" Whitney and Roger Chapman, except where noted.

U.S. Vinyl track listing (All CD issues contain the UK track listing)

Personnel

Family
Roger Chapman – vocals, percussion
John "Charlie" Whitney – guitars, banjo, organ
John Weider – guitars, bass, violin, dobro
John "Poli" Palmer – vibes, piano, flute
Robert Townsend – drums, percussion, harp

Additional musicians
 George Bruno - organ (3)

Technical
 Family – producer
 George Chkiantz – engineer
 Dave Bridges – assistant engineer
 Keith Harwood – assistant engineer
 Roger Beale – assistant engineer

Chart positions
Highest chart position (UK) – No. 4
Highest chart position (US) – did not chart

References

1970 albums
Family (band) albums
Reprise Records albums
Albums produced by Roger Chapman
Albums produced by John "Charlie" Whitney
Albums produced by Rob Townsend
Albums produced by John Palmer (musician)
Albums produced by John Weider